The Radio Beach Shoreline is the only beach in Oakland, California. On the San Francisco Bay, it borders the onramp to the Bay Bridge, leading into San Francisco. Its name refers to the radio towers on the beach.

The beach is also known as 'Toll Plaza beach' due to its location next to the toll booths for the Bay Bridge.

It's a popular place among kitesurfers from March to June.

See also

List of beaches in California
List of California state parks

External links

Radio Beach at Waterfront Action website

Geography of Oakland, California
San Francisco Bay Area beaches
Beaches of Alameda County, California
Beaches of Northern California